Bottoms is a hamlet in west Cornwall, England, UK. The hamlet of Trebehor lies further west. It contains St Levan CP School, St Levan's community primary school.

References

Hamlets in Cornwall